Ernest Wesley Strahan (March 1, 1901–1971) was a politician from the U.S. state of Kansas, who served for 14 years as a Republican in the Kansas State Senate.

Strahan resided in Salina, Kansas, where in addition to serving in the State Senate, he was a manufacturer of ice cream. In 1971, he died in office, and John M. Simpson was appointed to the State Senate to replace him.

References

Republican Party Kansas state senators
Politicians from Salina, Kansas
American chief executives of food industry companies
Businesspeople from Kansas
20th-century American politicians
1901 births
1971 deaths
Date of death missing